Brandon Joel Gaetano Borrello (born 25 July 1995) is an Australian professional footballer for A-League club Western Sydney Wanderers.

Club career

Brisbane Roar
On 30 January 2017, Borrello scored four goals in an AFC Champions League qualifying game for Brisbane Roar against Global, becoming the first Australian player to score four goals in a game in the Champions League. He also scored in the next round in a win over a Shanghai Shenua side which included Carlos Tevez, earning the Roar qualification to the group stage.

He was nominated in January 2017 for the A-League Young Footballer of the Year award for the 2016–17 season.

1. FC Kaiserslautern
Borrello joined 2. Bundesliga side 1. FC Kaiserslautern in May 2017 on a three-year deal.

SC Freiburg
On 23 July 2018, Borrello joined Bundesliga club SC Freiburg. The terms of the contract were undisclosed.

Loan to Fortuna Düsseldorf
On 1 September 2020, Borrello joined 2. Bundesliga side Fortuna Düsseldorf on a loan deal for one year. He left Fortuna upon the expiration of his contract on 24 May 2021.

Dynamo Dresden
In July 2021, Borrello joined newly promoted 2. Bundesliga club Dynamo Dresden for an undisclosed transfer fee, signing a two-year contract.

Western Sydney Wanderers 
On 25 July 2022, Borrello joined Western Sydney Wanderers on a two-year contract.

International career
Borrello made his debut for Australia national soccer team on 7 June 2019 in a friendly against South Korea, as a 70th-minute substitute for Awer Mabil.

Career statistics

Club

International

Honours
Brisbane Roar
A-League Premiership: 2013–14

Individual
Y-League BRFC Player of the Year: 2013–14

References

1995 births
Living people
Australian people of Italian descent
Soccer players from Adelaide
Australian soccer players
Association football forwards
Australia international soccer players
Australia youth international soccer players
Brisbane Roar FC players
1. FC Kaiserslautern players
1. FC Kaiserslautern II players
SC Freiburg players
SC Freiburg II players
Fortuna Düsseldorf players
Dynamo Dresden players
Western Sydney Wanderers FC players
A-League Men players
National Premier Leagues players
2. Bundesliga players
Bundesliga players
Australian expatriate soccer players
Australian expatriate sportspeople in Germany
Expatriate footballers in Germany
Australia under-20 international soccer players
Australia under-23 international soccer players